Guo Linxian (born 7 September 1965) is a Chinese gymnast. He competed in eight events at the 1988 Summer Olympics.

References

1965 births
Living people
Chinese male artistic gymnasts
Olympic gymnasts of China
Gymnasts at the 1988 Summer Olympics
Place of birth missing (living people)